The Tiled Kiosk is a pavilion set within the outer walls of Topkapı Palace and dates from 1472 as shown on the tile inscript above the main entrance. It was built by the Ottoman sultan Mehmed II as a pleasure palace or kiosk. It is located in the most outer parts of the palace, next to Gülhane Park. It was also called  Glazed Kiosk (Sırça Köşk).

It was used as the Imperial Museum between 1875 and 1891. In 1953, it was opened to the public as a museum of Turkish and Islamic art, and was later incorporated into the Istanbul Archaeology Museums, housing the Museum of Islamic Art.  The pavilion contains many examples of İznik tiles and Seljuk pottery.

Architecture
The building has a Greek cross shaped groundplan and two storeys high, although since the building straddles a declivity, only one floor is visible from the main entrance. The exterior glazed bricks show a Central Asian influence, especially from the Bibi-Khanym Mosque in Samarkand. The square, axial plan represents the four corners of the world and symbolizes, in architectural terms, the universal authority and sovereignty of the Sultan. As there is no Byzantine influence, the building is ascribed to an unknown Persian architect. The stone-framed brick and the polygonal pillars of the façade are typical of Persia. A grilled gate leads to the basement. Two flights of stairs above this gate lead to a roofed colonnaded terrace. This portico was rebuilt in the 18th century. The great door in the middle, surrounded by a tiled green arch, leads to the vestibule and then to a loftily domed court. The three royal apartments are situated behind, with the middle apartment in apsidal form.

These apartments look out over the park to the Bosphorus. The network of ribbed vaulting suggests Gothic revival architecture, but it actually adds weight to the structure instead of sustaining it. The blue-and-white tiles on the wall are arranged in hexagons and triangles in the Bursa manner. Some show delicate patterns of flowers, leaves, clouds or other abstract forms. The white plasterwork is in the Persian manner.
On both wings of the domed court are eyvans, vaulted recesses open on one side.

Gallery

Admission
The museum is closed on Mondays. Opening hours are 9:00 to 17:00.

References

Literature 
 Sir Banister Fletcher. A History of Architecture. Boston: Butterworths, 1987. . NA200.F63 1987. discussion p611
 John Julius Norwich, ed. Great Architecture of the World. New York: Random House, 1975. . NA200.G76. discussion, facade photo, p140.
 John D. Hoag. Islamic Architecture. New York: Harry N. Abrams, 1977. . LC 76-41805. NA380.H58. plan drawing, fig427, p324. Goodwin, 1971.

External links 
 Over 150 pictures
 GreatBuildings.com | Tiled Kiosk

Topkapı Palace
Museums in Istanbul
Imperial residences in Turkey
Buildings and structures completed in 1472
Fatih
Museums established in 1953
1953 establishments in Turkey
Art museums and galleries in Istanbul
Buildings of Mehmed the Conqueror
Islamic museums